Cymindis longstaffi is a species of ground beetle in the subfamily Harpalinae. It was described by Andrewes in 1923.

References

longstaffi
Beetles described in 1923